Celebrity Big Brother is a spin-off of the British reality television series Big Brother, broadcast in the UK and Ireland. Originally broadcast on Channel 4 and E4 and later broadcast on Channel 5 and 5Star, it involves a group of celebrities, called housemates, living in isolation from the outside world in a custom-built "house". The actions of the participants are recorded constantly by microphones and cameras situated in each room. Regularly, the housemates nominate two other members of the group each to face eviction; those with the most nominations face a public telephone vote, and the housemate who receives the most public votes is evicted. This procedure continues until the final day, when the viewers vote for who of the remaining participants they want to win the programme. Profits from premium-rate telephone votes are donated to charities such as Comic Relief, Centrepoint and Samaritans.

Programme 
Twenty-two editions of Celebrity Big Brother have been made, involving a total of 276 housemates. The programme has been the centre of controversies over the actions and inclusion of some of its housemates. For instance, viewer and People for the Ethical Treatment of Animals (PETA) complaints prompted Hertfordshire Police to remove a coat from the 2006 edition after Pete Burns claimed that it was made from gorilla fur and therefore against the Convention on International Trade in Endangered Species agreement of 1975. However, after an analysis at the Natural History Museum, it was later discovered that the coat was made from the fur of Colobus monkeys. Fellow members of parliament criticised George Galloway's participation in the same series, stating that Galloway had missed important debates regarding his constituency, Bethnal Green and Bow, and rejecting claims that Galloway took part to raise political awareness amongst the British youth. The family of Stuart Lubbock, a man who died in Michael Barrymore's swimming pool, criticised the programme makers for paying the entertainer £150,000 to participate on the programme. Germaine Greer voluntarily left the 2005 series after accusing the producers of using "superior bullying" tactics against contestants; commentators such as Graham Norton have argued that the housemates are not "actual celebrities". During the 2009 series, 527 viewers complained to Ofcom, the majority concerned about Coolio's conduct towards female contestants, but it was decided that the broadcaster's code was not breached. Comments made by Heidi Fleiss also proved controversial during the final series to air on Channel 4 of the programme in 2010; she accused Ivana Trump of smuggling drugs onto the programme, a claim that Trump's spokesperson denied, and made comments about abortion that attracted criticism.

During the 2007 series, comments directed to and made about Shilpa Shetty from Jade Goody, Danielle Lloyd, Jo O'Meara and Jack Tweed caused an international racism controversy. The British and Indian governments commented on the issue, while Ofcom decreed that Channel 4 had been guilty of "serious editorial misjudgements" after 54,000 viewers claimed that Shetty had been the victim of racial discrimination. The broadcaster was made to air a series of on-air apologies, and the programme was not included in Channel 4's 2008 schedule; it was replaced by Big Brother: Celebrity Hijack. In 2009, Channel 4's director of television Kevin Lygo announced that Big Brother "had reached a natural end point" and the 2010 edition was the final celebrity series to air on the channel. However, Channel 5 stated in April 2011 that it has signed a two-year deal with Endemol, the show's creators, to air both version of the programme for a reported £220m. The series started on 18 August 2011 and former Big Brother winner Brian Dowling replaced Davina McCall as the programme's presenter. Dowling presented the programme until January 2013, his final series being Celebrity Big Brother 11. Emma Willis presented from the twelfth series to the twenty-second and final series of the show.

John McCririck, Jackie Stallone, Pete Burns, Jade Goody, Ken Russell, Coolio, Verne Troyer, Ivana Trump, Dustin Diamond, Lionel Blair, Leslie Jordan, Keith Chegwin, David Gest, Colin Newell, Sarah Harding, Derek Acorah and Kirstie Alley have all died since their appearances.

Housemates

 Winner
 Runner-up
 Third place
 Walked/Illness
 Ejected
 Housemate entered for the second time

Notes
  Ages at the time the celebrity entered the house

Guests
On some occasions, celebrities entered the house for a short period of time as guests.

International versions

References

External links 

 
 

Celebrity Big Brother housemates
Celebrity Big Brother (British TV series)
Big Brother (British TV series) contestants